Cho Ho-sung (born 15 June 1974) is a South Korean former cyclist, who currently works as the team manager for UCI Continental team . At the 2012 Summer Olympics, he competed in the men's omnium.

References

External links

South Korean male cyclists
Living people
Olympic cyclists of South Korea
Cyclists at the 1996 Summer Olympics
Cyclists at the 2000 Summer Olympics
Cyclists at the 2012 Summer Olympics
South Korean track cyclists
1974 births
Asian Games medalists in cycling
Cyclists at the 1994 Asian Games
Cyclists at the 1998 Asian Games
Cyclists at the 2002 Asian Games
Cyclists at the 2010 Asian Games
Cyclists at the 2014 Asian Games
Medalists at the 1994 Asian Games
Medalists at the 1998 Asian Games
Medalists at the 2002 Asian Games
Medalists at the 2010 Asian Games
Medalists at the 2014 Asian Games
Asian Games gold medalists for South Korea
Asian Games silver medalists for South Korea
20th-century South Korean people
21st-century South Korean people